The Aberhart Ministry was the combined Cabinet (called Executive Council of Alberta), chaired by Premier William Aberhart, and Ministers that governed Alberta from the 8th Alberta Legislature from September 3, 1935, to mid-point of the 9th Alberta Legislature on May 23, 1943.

The Executive Council (commonly known as the cabinet) was made up of members of the Alberta Social Credit Party which held a majority of seats in the Legislative Assembly of Alberta. The cabinet was appointed by the Lieutenant Governor of Alberta on the advice of the Premier.

List of ministers

See also 

 Executive Council of Alberta
 List of Alberta provincial ministers

References 

 

Politics of Alberta
Executive Council of Alberta
1935 establishments in Alberta
1943 disestablishments in Alberta
Cabinets established in 1935
Cabinets disestablished in 1943